Ulocladium consortiale is a fungal plant pathogen infecting tomatoes and cucurbits. It is also causing disease in caraway seedlings.

References

External links 
 USDA ARS Fungal Database

Fungal plant pathogens and diseases
Tomato diseases
Vegetable diseases
Pleosporaceae